Robert Woodward Rahal (born January 10, 1953) is an American former auto racing driver and team owner. As a driver he won three championships and 24 races in the CART open-wheel series, including the 1986 Indianapolis 500. He also won the 2004 and 2020 Indy 500s as a team owner for Buddy Rice and Takuma Sato, respectively.

After retiring as a driver, Rahal held managerial positions with the Jaguar Formula 1 team and also was an interim president of the CART series. Rahal was also a sports car driver during the 1980s, and made one NASCAR start for the Wood Brothers.

Racing career

Rahal began his career in SCCA feeder categories, eventually finishing second to Gilles Villeneuve in the 1977 Formula Atlantic championship. The following year, he competed in the 1978 New Zealand Grand Prix with Fred Opert Racing (Formula Pacific) and in European Formula Three with Wolf Racing. Near the end of the season, Rahal raced for the Wolf Formula 1 team in the 1978 United States Grand Prix and the 1978 Canadian Grand Prix. The deal with Wolf did not continue into the 1979 season, as Wolf signed up James Hunt for the one and only car available. Rahal began the 1979 racing a Chevron in Formula Two, but returned to America mid-season and raced in the Can-Am series. During the next few seasons, he competed in various sports car events, including the 24 Hours of Le Mans and the IMSA GT Championship.

In 1982, Rahal entered the CART series with the Truesports team, winning two races and finishing second in the championship behind Rick Mears. He continued racing for Truesports through the 1988 season, winning at least one race every year. In 1986, Rahal dramatically passed Kevin Cogan on a restart with two laps to go to win the Indianapolis 500, only days before his team owner, Jim Trueman died of cancer. Later that year, Rahal won his first CART championship, and successfully defended it the following year.

In 1988, Rahal won the last race the Truesports team ever won, the Quaker State 500 at Pocono, the only victory for the Judd engine ever.

During his CART career, Rahal also won races in IMSA and IROC. By 1989, Rahal had ended his occasional forays into sports car racing and focused solely on CART. He moved over to the Kraco race team, but this association produced only two wins over three seasons.

Rahal competed in one NASCAR race in his career.  In November 1984 he drove the 7-11 sponsored Wood Brothers #21 Ford (substituting for Buddy Baker) to a 40th-place finish in the Winston Western 500 at Riverside International Speedway, completing only 44 laps before breaking a rear end gear.

IndyCar owner

After losing the championship to Michael Andretti in 1991, Rahal (with partner Carl Hogan) acquired the assets to the former Pat Patrick Racing team, with Rahal becoming an owner-driver. The team was an immediate success in 1992, producing four wins for Rahal and his third CART championship, making him the last owner-driver to win the CART title, and the last driver to win a race in his own car until Adrian Fernandez did so in 2003. In 1993, Rahal attempted to develop his own Rahal-Hogan chassis, but reverted to the Lola chassis after failing to qualify for the 1993 Indianapolis 500. In 1994 the team brought the Honda engine into the CART series. Except for a second-place finish at Toronto, he and teammate Mike Groff struggled to show the full potential of an engine that would soon dominate the series. In 1995 at Long Beach Rahal became the 10th driver in Championship Car history (including AAA, USAC, and CART) to start 200 races in his career. Despite no wins, Rahal finished a strong 3rd in the 1995 standings using the Mercedes engine.

Rahal continued as a racing driver until his retirement in 1998. Meanwhile, Hogan left to form his own team and talk show host David Letterman became a minority owner in 1996. The team became known as Team Rahal in 1996 and Rahal Letterman Racing in 2004, when Rahal switched from CART to the IRL full-time.

Other business roles
In 2000, Rahal joined the Jaguar Formula One team in a managerial capacity. During this time, Rahal attempted to hire championship-winning aerodynamicist Adrian Newey, briefly believing that the deal had been completed, but was unsuccessful. However, Rahal was fired after reportedly attempting to sell driver Eddie Irvine to rivals Jordan. Ironically, the team fired Irvine little more than a year after firing Rahal, while Newey joined in 2006, a year after the team was sold to Red Bull.

Rahal was the interim President and CEO of CART for six months during the 2000 season.

His business interests include Bobby Rahal Automotive Group, a network of car dealerships in western and central Pennsylvania selling Acura, BMW, Honda, Jaguar, Land Rover, Lexus, Mercedes-Benz, Toyota and Volvo.

In 2021 Rahal began to venture into race promoting with the help of former IndyCar and Indianapolis Motor Speedway owner Tony George. Rahal's first move in race promotion was to return the popular Iowa Speedway round to IndyCar after it had been left off of the 2021 calendar. Rahal was able to recruit Iowa supermarket chain Hy-Vee as a sponsor and secured a multi year agreement between IndyCar and Iowa Speedway to run a double header event at the track starting in 2022.

Awards
International Motorsports Hall of Fame (2004)
Motorsports Hall of Fame of America (2004)
SCCA Hall of Fame (2013)
Indianapolis Motor Speedway Hall of Fame (2014)
Simeone Foundation Spirit of Competition Award (2014)

Tribute
At WeatherTech Raceway Laguna Seca, the back straight leading up to the corkscrew was named the "Rahal Straight" in his honor.

Personal life
Rahal formerly lived in New Albany, Ohio. Rahal is a graduate of Denison University. He now lives in Lincoln Park, near the lakefront of Chicago. He is the son of sports car racer Mike Rahal  and the father of Graham Rahal, who now races in the IndyCar Series.

Rahal owns a 1975 Lola T360 which he occasionally races at vintage racing events.

Rahal also grew up in the Chicago suburbs and attended Glenbard West High School as class of 1971.

Motorsports career results

SCCA National Championship Runoffs

Complete Formula One World Championship results
(key) (Races in bold indicate pole position / Races in italics indicate fastest lap)

Complete European Formula Two Championship results
(key) (Races in bold indicate pole position; races in italics indicate fastest lap)

American Open Wheel Racing
(key) (Races in bold indicate pole position)

PPG Indy Car Series

Indianapolis 500 results

NASCAR
(key) (Bold – Pole position awarded by qualifying time. Italics – Pole position earned by points standings or practice time. * – Most laps led.)

Winston Cup Series

24 Hours of Le Mans results

References

External links
 Rahal Letterman Racing website
 Rahal's automobile dealerships website
 The Greatest 33
 

Living people
1953 births
People from Medina, Ohio
Racing drivers from Ohio
American Formula One drivers
Wolf Formula One drivers
Indianapolis 500 drivers
Indianapolis 500 winners
24 Hours of Le Mans drivers
24 Hours of Daytona drivers
Champ Car champions
Champ Car drivers
Atlantic Championship drivers
European Formula Two Championship drivers
NASCAR drivers
International Race of Champions drivers
IndyCar Series team owners
International Motorsports Hall of Fame inductees
Formula One team principals
Auto racing executives
Denison University alumni
American people of Lebanese descent
World Sportscar Championship drivers
SCCA National Championship Runoffs winners
SCCA Formula Super Vee drivers
Rahal Letterman Lanigan Racing
Force family
12 Hours of Sebring drivers
Jaguar in Formula One
Sportspeople of Lebanese descent
Rahal Letterman Lanigan Racing drivers
USAC Gold Crown champions